Madeleine Sherwood (born Madeleine Louise Hélène Thornton; November 13, 1922 – April 23, 2016) was a Canadian actress of stage, film and television. She was widely known for her portrayals of Mae/Sister Woman and Miss Lucy in both the Broadway and film versions of Tennessee Williams' Cat on a Hot Tin Roof and Sweet Bird of Youth. She starred or featured in 18 original Broadway productions including Arturo Ui, Do I Hear a Waltz? and The Crucible. In 1963 she won an Obie Award for Best Actress for her performance in Hey You, Light Man! Off-Broadway. In television, she is best known for her role of Reverend Mother Placido to Sally Field's Sister Bertrille in The Flying Nun (1967–70).

Early life
Sherwood was born in Montreal, Quebec, the granddaughter of the Dean of Dentistry at McGill University. Sherwood made her first stage appearance at the age of four in a church Passion Play. She started her professional career in Montreal when Rupert Kaplan cast her in CBC dramas and soap operas.

Career
Sherwood moved to New York City in 1950 and made her first Broadway appearance in Horton Foote's The Chase, replacing Kim Stanley. In 1953 she originated the role of Abigail in Arthur Miller's The Crucible. Elia Kazan cast her as Mae/Sister Woman in Cat on a Hot Tin Roof (1954) and as Miss Lucy in Sweet Bird of Youth (1959), both by Tennessee Williams. She reprised both roles in the film versions. She became a member of the Actors Studio in 1957 working with Lee Strasberg and was a life member of the Studio.

Sherwood appeared in many soap operas over the years, most notably on Guiding Light as Mrs. Eilers and The Secret Storm as diner owner Carmen. She had cameos on All My Children as a bag lady and Another World as a befuddled matron, returning to Guiding Light briefly as Roxie Shayne's madame, Diamond Lil. She was featured in one of the last episodes of Capitol.. Sherwood also played Reverend Mother Placido in the comedy TV series The Flying Nun.

Personal life

Sherwood was blacklisted during the McCarthy era. Active in the civil rights movement, she worked with Martin Luther King Jr., in the late 1950s and 1960s and went south to join the Congress of Racial Equality (CORE). In 1965, Sherwood was arrested while participating in a Freedom Walk in Gadsden, Alabama, jailed, and sentenced to six months hard labor, for "[E]ndangering the Customs and Mores of the People of Alabama".

During the 1980s, she received a grant from the American Film Institute as one of the first women to direct short films for that organization (along with Cicely Tyson, Joanne Woodward, and others). She wrote, directed and acted in her film, Good Night, Sweet Prince, which received excellent notices.

In the 1970s, she met Gloria Steinem, Betty Friedan and other activists at the First Women’s Sexual Conference at Barnard College in New York City. From there, she started consciousness-raising groups and counseling workshops for Women and Incest.

In the early 1990s, she returned to Canada and resettled in Victoria, British Columbia, and Saint-Hippolyte, Quebec. She had been a long-term permanent resident of the United States, but remained a Canadian citizen all her life. She was a member of the Society of Friends (Quakers).

Death
Sherwood died on April 23, 2016, at her childhood home in Lac Cornu, Quebec. No cause of death was disclosed. She was survived by her daughter.

Original Broadway productions
The Chase
The Crucible
Cat on a Hot Tin Roof
Sweet Bird of Youth
The Night of the Iguana (succeeded Bette Davis)
Invitation to a March
Arturo Ui
Do I Hear a Waltz?
Inadmissible Evidence
All Over

Off-Broadway – original productions
Getting Out
Hey You, Light Man
Brecht on Becket
Older People (at Joseph Papp’s Public Theater)

Selected film and television roles

Baby Doll (1956) as Nurse in Doctor's Office (uncredited)
Cat on a Hot Tin Roof (1958) as Mae Flynn Pollitt
Parrish (1961) as Addie
Alfred Hitchcock Presents (1961, Episode: "Make My Death Bed") as Jackie Darby
Sweet Bird of Youth (1962) as Miss Lucy
In the Cool of the Day (1963) as Party Hostess (uncredited)
The Fugitive (1963, Season 1, Episode 2: "The Witch") as Mrs Ammory
The Edge of Night (1964, TV Series) as Ann Kelly #1
The Fugitive (1964, Season 2, Episode 14: "Devil's Carnival") as Mary Beth Thompson
Hurry Sundown (1967) as Eula Purcell
The Flying Nun (1967–1970, TV Series) as Reverend Mother Superior Placido
Pendulum (1969) as Eileen Sanderson
The Guiding Light (1970–1971, TV Series) as Betty Eiler
The Manhunter (1972, TV Movie) as Ma Bocock
The Secret Storm (1972–1973, TV Series) as Carmen
Wicked, Wicked (1973) as Lenore Karadyne
Columbo (1974, TV Series) as Miss Brady
Rich Man, Poor Man Book II (1976, TV Series) as Mrs. Hunt
The Changeling (1980) as Mrs. Norman
One Life to Live  (1980) as Bridget Leander
Resurrection (1980) as Ruth
The Electric Grandmother (1982, TV Movie) as Aunt Clara
Teachers (1984) as Grace
Nobody's Child (1986, TV Movie) as Nurse Rhonda
The Morning Man (1986)
Silence Like Glass (1989) as Grandmother
An Unremarkable Life (1989) as Louise

References

External links
 
 
 
 
 Madeleine Sherwood at the University of Wisconsin's Actors Studio audio collection

1922 births
2016 deaths
Actresses from Montreal
Canadian film actresses
Canadian Quakers
Canadian stage actresses
Canadian television actresses
Hollywood blacklist
Canadian expatriate actresses in the United States
Activists for African-American civil rights